Harry A. Ely was an American football and baseball coach.  He served as the head football coach at Fordham University in 1892 and 1903, compiling a record of 3–3.  Ely was also the head baseball coach at Fordham from 1892 to 1893, tallying a mark of 94–31–2.

Head coaching record

Football

See also
 List of college football head coaches with non-consecutive tenure

References

Year of birth missing
Year of death missing
Fordham Rams baseball coaches
Fordham Rams football coaches
Yale Bulldogs football players